Bacardi Building may refer to:
Bacardi Building (Havana), building in Cuba
Bacardi Building (Mexico City), building in Mexico
Bacardi Buildings (Miami), buildings in US